Vivallos Glacier is a short, steep glacier flowing north into Leith Cove, Paradise Harbor, Danco Coast. Following survey by the Chilean Antarctic Expedition, 1950–51, the glacier was named for Cabo Jose L. Vivallos, a member of the expedition.

Glaciers of Danco Coast